The First Lap is a 2017 South Korean drama film, written, directed and edited by Kim Dae-hwan. It made its international premiere in the Filmmakers of the Present Competition at the 70th Locarno International Film Festival and won Best Emerging Director as well as received a Special Mention in the Junior Jury Awards.

Synopsis
Ji-young (Kim Sae-byuk) and Soo-hyun (Cho Hyun-chul) have been living together for six years. Now, they have to deal with an unplanned pregnancy and also pressure from their families to get married.

Cast
 Kim Sae-byuk as Ji-young
 Cho Hyun-chul as Soo-hyun 
 Gi Ju-bong as Ji-young's father
 Jo Kyung-sook as Ji-young's mother
 Jung Do-won as Min-hyuk
 Moon Chang-gil as Soo-hyun's father
 Gil Hae-yeon as Soo-hyun's mother

Awards and nominations

References

External links
 
 
 

2017 films
2010s Korean-language films
South Korean drama films
2017 drama films
2010s South Korean films